Alone yet Not Alone: Their Faith Became Their Freedom (retitled Massacre at Buffalo Valley for some television showings) is a 2013 American Christian captivity narrative historical drama film directed by Ray Bengston, co-directed by George D. Escobar, and starring Kelly Greyson, Jenn Gotzon, and Clay Walker. Adapted from Tracy Leininger Craven's namesake novel, the film gets its title from the German hymn "Allein, und doch nicht ganz allein." It dramatizes the true story of three preteen girls, Barbara and Regina Leininger and Marie LeRoy, whom the Lenape forcibly seized in the 1755 Penn's Creek massacre.

James R. Leininger, the father of the original novel's author and descendent of the portrayed Leiningers, partially funded Alone yet Not Alone. The film's title song, "Alone yet Not Alone," was nominated for Best Original Song at the Academy Awards. However, the academy rescinded the nomination two weeks later due to alleged tampering from Bruce Broughton.

Plot 
In the mid-18th century, the Leininger family immigrates from Germany to Penns Creek, Pennsylvania, building a farm there. When six Indian chiefs attempt to ally with Edward Braddock against the French, he mockingly dismisses them, leading the Indians to support the French instead.

One day in 1755, when Mrs. Leininger and John were away at the mill, the Indian brothers Galasko and Hannawoa assaulted the farm, burning it down and killing Mr. Leininger and Christian. They kidnap Barbara and Regina, placing them with a group of captured children, including their close friend Marie LeRoy. After a few days, the Indians march the captives away, dubbing Barbara "Susquehanna" and Regina "Tskinnak." They divide the hostages between warriors from two tribes at a crossroads, separating Regina from Barbara and Marie. In grief, Barbara attempts to escape by stealing a horse but is almost immediately recaptured. Though the Indians initially condemn her to burn alive, Galasko convinces Hannawoa and the others to spare her after she promises never to flee again. The Indians holding Barbara and Marie march their captives to the French Fort du Quesne.

In the massacre's aftermath, protests from the captives' families convince the Pennsylvania legislature to appropriate a defense bill. The raised militia assaults Fort du Quesne, causing the Indians to transfer most of the hostages deep into the forest, including Barbara and Marie. The Indians decide to execute a woman named Lydia Barrett for attempting to escape during the battle, during which she managed to hide her two sons for the militia to rescue. Not wanting her to die painfully by fire, a French officer shoots Barrett out of mercy after a scuffle with the Indians. After the conflict subsides, the Indians escort the captives to their village, dressing and painting them as Indians and assimilating them into their tribe.

Several years later, Barbara, now a teenager, learns Marie intends to escape with two other captives, Owen and David, but initially dismisses their plan as unworkable. However, when Galasko proposes marriage to her and gives her Mrs. Leininger's brooch, which he grabbed in the raid, Barbara remembers her past and agrees to Marie's plans. When the Indians schedule her wedding after a planned three-day hunt, Barbara, Marie, Owen, and David slip away at night. Hannwoa immediately discovers their absence and begins following them. The fugitives encounter a bear, which severely slashes David's leg after he shoots and attempts to charge it, scaring it away. Hannwoa angrily confronts Galasko over Barbara's betrayal, murdering him in his rage.

When the four fugitives make it to Fort Pitt, the British soldiers initially deny them help out of paranoia. Barbara desperately begs for help in German, making the soldiers realize they're telling the truth and agree to shelter them. Hannwoa appears, having caught up with the fugitives, and furiously engages the soldiers, killing several before Barbara kills him with a dead soldier's pistol. After spending a month at Fort Pitt, Barbara, Marie, Owen, and David travel to Philadelphia, reuniting with Mrs. Leininger and John. Barbara returns her mother's brooch to her, who informs her that Regina is still missing. Owen and David enlist in the Pennsylvania militia.

Several years later, Barbara married her friend Fritz Hecklinger and had two children with him. That year, Henry Muhlenberg informs the family on Christmas Eve that Colonel Armstrong has defeated the Indians in Ohio. As the British forced them to relinquish all war prisoners, he urged them to rush to Fort Carlisle. After arriving there, Owen informs them that David died in the Battle of Bushy Run. Barbara reassures him that Marie remains unmarried for him, and the lovers embrace. Unable to recognize Regina among the liberated children, Mrs. Leininger sings "Alone yet Not Alone" to them. The song rekindles Regina's memories and makes her run into her family's loving embrace.

Regina lived with her mother until they died, never married, and Stouchsburg erected a monument over their adjacent tombstones. Barbara eventually had a third child in Berks County and named her daughter after her sister. She died in 1805 in the Cumru Township.

Cast

 Kelly Greyson as Barbara Leininger/Susquehanna
Natalie Racoosin as Young Barbara 
 Victoria Emmons as Marie LeRoy
 Kelly Devens as young Marie
 Hayley Lovitt as Regina Leininger/Tskinnak
Cassie Brennan as Young Regina
 Robert Pierce as Papa Leininger
 Joanie Stewart as Mama Leininger
 Joseph Gray as John Leininger
 James Hartner as Christian Leininger
 Jenn Gotzon as Lydia Barrett
 Clay Walker as Fritz Hecklinger
 Justin Tully as young Fritz
 Brett Harris as Owen
 Ian Nelson as young Owen
 John Telfer as David
 Joshua Hunter Magers as young David
 Ozzie Torres as Galasko
 Tony Wade as Hannawoa
 Brett Harris as Owen Gibson / Souchy or Second Son
 Ron Pinson Jr. as Chief Selinquaw
 Carl LeMon as Henry Muhlenberg
 Josh Murray as George Washington
 Barry K. Bedwell as Benjamin Franklin
 James McKeny as Edward Braddock
 Joel King as Robert Hunter Morris
 Douglas W. Phillips as Hugh Mercer
 Paul Ganus as John Armstrong Sr.
 Thurman Bryan as Sergeant Mueller

Release
Alone yet Not Alone received a limited theatrical release in nine markets on September 27, 2013, and grossed $125,775 in its opening weekend. By the end of its three-week run on October 11, it had grossed $133,546 at the domestic box office, with a per-screen average of $13,396. The film received a wide release on June 13, 2014, eventually grossing $887,851 against its budget of $7 million, making it a box-office bomb.

Academy Awards controversy

Bruce Broughton and Dennis Spiegel wrote, and Joni Eareckson Tada performed, Alone yet Not Alone's namesake title song. "Alone yet Not Alone" received a nomination for an Academy Award for Best Original Song at the 86th Academy Awards. However, the Academy of Motion Picture Arts and Sciences soon discovered Broughton, former governor and current executive committee member of the academy's music branch, improperly contacting other members of his branch. They thus rescinded their nomination on January 29, 2014. Academy president Cheryl Boone Isaacs claimed that using a position of authority within the academy to promote an Oscar submission "creates the appearance of an unfair advantage."

This incident was not the first time the academy rescinded a nomination. However, it was the first time the Academy cited ethical grounds for it and the first time it did so on a scripted American-produced feature film. Broughton claimed an industry double standard, saying him sending out "70 or so emails" was comparable to Isaacs' involvement in The Artist and The King's Speech as an academy governor.

References

External links
 
 
 
 
 

2013 films
2010s adventure drama films
2010s historical films
American adventure drama films
American captivity narratives
American historical adventure films
Films about Christianity
Film controversies
American films based on actual events
Films based on American novels
Films set in Pennsylvania
Films set in 1755
Films shot in North Carolina
Films shot in Tennessee
Films shot in Virginia
Films scored by William Ross
Films scored by Bruce Broughton
American independent films
2013 independent films
2013 drama films
2010s English-language films
2010s American films